Ellison Capers (October 14, 1837 – April 22, 1908) was a Confederate general in the American Civil War, theologian, college professor and administrator from South Carolina.

Early life
Capers was the son of a Methodist bishop. He was born in Charleston, South Carolina, and educated in local schools. He graduated from the South Carolina Military Academy (now The Citadel) in 1857; he studied law for a time and then was appointed as a Professor of Mathematics and Rhetoric at SCMA. He spent a year teaching mathematics at Mt. Zion College in Winnsboro, South Carolina, then returned to his position at SCMA in 1860.

Civil War
At the outbreak of the Civil War, Capers joined the Confederate Army with the rank of major. He was present at the bombardment of Fort Sumter then saw action at James Island and the Battle of Secessionville; he next served on coastal defense duties until 1863, having been promoted to lieutenant colonel of the 24th South Carolina. In May 1863 the regiment joined the army of General Joseph E. Johnston for the Vicksburg Campaign. Capers was wounded in the leg at Jackson, Mississippi, but promoted to colonel.

Capers returned to field service in time for the Chickamauga Campaign with the Army of Tennessee. He fought in the disastrous Battle of Franklin where he was severely wounded. After the campaign he commanded a brigade, replacing States Rights Gist, who had been killed in action. Capers was promoted to brigadier general on March 1, 1865, shortly before the end of hostilities. He was captured at Bentonville, North Carolina, but there is no record of parole.

Postbellum career

Capers returned home after the Civil War. In December 1865, he was elected Secretary of State for South Carolina. Ordained as an Episcopal Priest in 1868 he was rector of Christ Church (Episcopal) in Greenville while also teaching at Greenville Military Academy, Greenville Female Academy and Furman University. In 1875 he became minister of St Johns Church in Selma, Alabama, and after a year returned to Christ Church in Greenville; in 1887 he was called to Trinity Church in Columbia, South Carolina.

He was elected Coadjutor Bishop of South Carolina and was consecrated on July 20, 1893.  He became the diocesan bishop, the third bishop of South Carolina, in 1894.
He served as the Episcopal Bishop of South Carolina from 1894 to his death, he also served as chancellor of Sewanee: The University of the South from 1904 to 1908. He served on the board of the John F. Slater Fund for the Education of Freedmen.

In 1859 he married Charlotte Rebecca Palmer (1837–1908), the Great Granddaughter of Francis Marion; they had 5 children. His sister Mary was the first wife of Major Peter F. Stevens, a fellow SCMA Professor who was Superintendent 1859–61 and also later an Episcopal Bishop. Bishop Capers died in Columbia, South Carolina, in 1908 and is buried there at Trinity Episcopal Churchyard.

Honors
He was awarded an honorary Doctorate of Divinity by the University of South Carolina in 1889.
The General Ellison Capers Camp #1212 of the Sons of Confederate Veterans was named in his honor.
Capers Hall, the main academic building at The Citadel is named for him and his brother Major Francis W. Capers, who served as Superintendent from 1852 to 1859.  Ellison delivered the commencement address at The Citadel in 1886.

See also

 List of American Civil War generals (Confederate)
 List of American Civil War generals (Union)
 Bibliography of the American Civil War

Notes

References
Evans, Clement A., Confederate Military History, Volume III Atlanta, Georgia: Confederate Publishing Company, 1899.
 Eicher, John H., and Eicher, David J., Civil War High Commands, Stanford University Press, 2001, .
 Sifakis, Stewart. Who Was Who in the Civil War. New York: Facts On File, 1988. .
 Warner, Ezra J. Generals in Gray: Lives of the Confederate Commanders. Baton Rouge: Louisiana State University Press, 1959. .

External links

1837 births
1908 deaths
Confederate States Army generals
Military personnel from Charleston, South Carolina
Episcopal bishops of South Carolina
People of South Carolina in the American Civil War
The Citadel, The Military College of South Carolina alumni
The Citadel, The Military College of South Carolina faculty
Sewanee: The University of the South administrators
Converts to Anglicanism from Methodism
19th-century American Episcopalians